Ahmad Nasir Lal (born 1963) is an Afghan former wrestler. He competed at the 1988 Summer Olympic Games in the flyweight event.

References

External links
 

1963 births
Living people
Afghan male sport wrestlers
Olympic wrestlers of Afghanistan
Wrestlers at the 1988 Summer Olympics
Place of birth missing (living people)